Marangani District is one of eight districts of the province Canchis in Peru.

Geography 
The La Raya mountain range traverses the district. Some of the highest mountains are listed below:

The most important river of the district is the Willkanuta which crosses the district from southeast to northwest.

Ethnic groups 
The people in the district are mainly indigenous citizens of Quechua descent. Quechua is the language which the majority of the population (80.81%) learnt to speak in childhood, 18.82% of the residents started speaking using the Spanish language (2007 Peru Census).

References

1834 establishments in Peru